D. D. Lewis may refer to:

 D. D. Lewis (linebacker, born 1945), played college football for Mississippi State University and in the National Football League for the Dallas Cowboys
 D. D. Lewis (linebacker, born 1979), played college football for University of Texas and in the National Football League for the Seattle Seahawks and Denver Broncos
 Daniel Day-Lewis, English actor

See also
 Lewis (surname)